Mansi Srivastava is an Indian television actress. She made her television debut in 2012 through Suvreen Guggal and gained popularity with her performances in Do Dil Bandhe Ek Dori Se, Sasural Simar Ka, Ishqbaaaz, Divya Drishti and Ishq Mein Marjawan 2. In 2021, she portrayed the role of Sonakshi Raichand in Kundali Bhagya.

Personal life 
Srivastava got engaged to Mohit Abrol in 2016, however, the couple split-up after a few months. She then started dating Kapil Tejwani in 2019 and the duo got married on 22 January 2022.

Career

Srivastava commenced her television career in 2012, when she started playing Jasleen Guggal in Channel V's Suvreen Guggal – Topper of The Year until its culmination in 2013. In 2012, she also appeared as Payal Verma in the Star Plus-aired episodic crime thriller Arjun.

In 2013, she starred in Zee TV's serials Rab Se Sohna Isshq and Do Dil Bandhe Ek Dori Se as Heer Singh and Shivani Rana, respectively. In the latter, her chemistry with Arhaan Behll was acclaimed, though it ended in 2014. She also portrayed Shatabdi in Sony Sab's Peterson Hill and Parvati in Zee TV's Neeli Chatri Waale.

Srivastava then appeared in an episode of &TV's Darr Sabko Lagta Hai. She next played Dr. Prerna in Colors TV's Sasural Simar Ka. In 2016, she was also seen in the episodes serials Yeh Hai Aashiqui, Pyaar Tune Kya Kiya, and appeared in MTV India's MTV Big F.

In 2017, she began portraying Bhavya Pratap Rathore in Star Plus's Ishqbaaaz opposite Leenesh Mattoo and also appeared in its spin-off Dil Boley Oberoi. That year, Srivastava played Anika in Zee TV's Fear Files and Nitya in &TV's Laal Ishq as well. In both of them, she was seen in an episode.

In 2019, she played Lavanya in Star Plus's Divya Drishti. In February 2020, Srivastava joined Colors TV's Vidya as Mahek. In the same year she played the role of Ahana in the show Ishq Mein Marjawan 2 aired on Colors TV. She debuted in music video through Maula by Gaurav Sharma.

In 2021, Srivastava played Sonakshi Raichand in Zee TV's Kundali Bhagya. In August 2022, she joined the cast of Colors TV's Saavi Ki Savaari as Dimpi Dalmiya.

Filmography

Television

Web series

References

External links

 

Living people
Indian television actresses
Indian soap opera actresses
21st-century Indian actresses
Actresses in Hindi television
Year of birth missing (living people)